Tanya-Gee Blake (born 16 January 1971 in London, England, United Kingdom) is a retired  middle-distance runner, who specialized in the 800 metres. Born in England, she represented Malta internationally. Holding a dual citizenship to compete internationally, Blake set a historic milestone as the first Maltese athlete to break a two-minute barrier and a national record in the 800 metres at the 2003 Prefontaine Classic Grand Prix in Eugene, Oregon, United States, that guaranteed her a spot on her adopted nation's team for the 2004 Summer Olympics. During her athletic career, Blake trained for the Zurrieq Wolves track and field team.

Blake qualified for the Maltese squad in the women's 800 metres at the 2004 Summer Olympics in Athens, by registering her career best and an A-standard entry time of 1:59.56 from the Prefontaine Classic. Unable to flaunt her stellar race from the Grand Prix a year earlier, Blake posted outside her national record of 2:19.34, but failed to advance further into the semifinals, as she was the last runner to cross the finish line in heat six.

Personal life
Blake was born in England to a Maltese mother and American father.

References

External links
 

1971 births
Living people
Athletes from London
Maltese female middle-distance runners
Olympic athletes of Malta
English female middle-distance runners
English people of Maltese descent
English people of American descent
People with acquired Maltese citizenship
Athletes (track and field) at the 2004 Summer Olympics
Athletes (track and field) at the 2001 Mediterranean Games
Commonwealth Games competitors for Malta
Athletes (track and field) at the 1998 Commonwealth Games
Mediterranean Games competitors for Malta